An Athletics competition was contested at the 2006 Asian Games in Doha, Qatar from December 7 to December 12. Twenty-three events were contested for the men while 22 were on the slate for the women. Only the 3000 Meter Steeplechase was not contested for by the women.  All track and field events were held at Khalifa International Stadium, and the racewalking and marathon took place at the Doha Corniche. A total of 530 athletes (comprising 331 men and 199 women) from 41 nations took part in the competition. Bhutan, Brunei, Indonesia and Myanmar were the only nations without a representative in the events.

Schedule

Medalists

Men

Women

Medal table

Participating nations
A total of 530 athletes from 41 nations competed in athletics at the 2006 Asian Games:

References

Negash, Elshadai (2006-12-07). Chinese sweep Race Walk titles - Asian Games, Day One. IAAF. Retrieved on 2014-02-18.
Negash, Elshadai (2006-12-08). Zhang throws Asian Hammer Record - Asian Games, Day Two. IAAF. Retrieved on 2014-02-18.
Negash, Elshadai (2006-12-09). Jamal on course for double, while track debutant takes 10,000m title - Asian Games, Day Three. IAAF. Retrieved on 2014-02-18.
Negash, Elshadai (2006-12-10). Ramzi and Simpson defeated in Doha - Asian Games, Day Four. IAAF. Retrieved on 2014-02-18.
Negash, Elshadai (2006-12-11). Perfect tactics give Kamel 800m victory - Asian Games, Day Five. IAAF. Retrieved on 2014-02-18.
Negash, Elshadai (2006-12-12). Xiang 13.15, while Jamal completes double - Asian Games, Day Six. IAAF. Retrieved on 2014-02-18.

External links
  at the official website for the 2006 Doha Games

 
2006 Asian Games events
Asian Games
2006
International athletics competitions hosted by Qatar